Liostenogaster is a genus of hover wasps from the subfamily Stenogastrinae of the family Vespidae which has a distribution centred on south-east Asia. It was named by the Dutch entomologist Jacobus van der Vecht from material collected by Japanese scientists on an expedition to Thailand, Malaysia and Cambodia which took place in 1966.

Species
The following species are currently assigned to Liostenogaster:

 Liostenogaster abstrusa Turillazzi 1999 
 Liostenogaster campanulae Turillazzi 1999 
 Liostenogaster filicis Turillazzi 1999 
 Liostenogaster flaviplagiata (Cameron, 1902) 
 Liostenogaster flavolineata (Cameron, 1902) 
 Liostenogaster nitidipennis (de Saussure, 1853) 
 Liostenogaster pardii Turillazzi & Carfi 1996 
 Liostenogaster picta (Smith, 1860) 
 Liostenogaster topographica Turillazzi 1999 
 Liostenogaster tutua Turillazzi 1999 
 Liostenogaster variapicta (Rohwer, 1919) 
 Liostenogaster vechti Turillazzi 1999

References

Vespidae